Daniel Joshua Kash (born April 25, 1959) is a Canadian actor and film director.

Life and career
Kash was born in Montreal, Quebec, the son of Canadian opera singer Maureen Forrester and Toronto-born violinist and conductor Eugene Kash (May 1, 1912March 6, 2004). He is the brother of actress Linda Kash. His father's family was Jewish, while his mother converted to Judaism.

He studied acting at the Drama Centre in London, UK, and has appeared in both film and television. His first film role was Private Spunkmeyer in Aliens (1986). He has also directed three short films: Germgirl, Flip Phone and For Lease (released in 2007).

Credits
Kash has appeared in the films Life with Judy Garland: Me and My Shadows, Camp Rock 2: The Final Jam (as Axel Turner), The Hunt for the BTK Killer, Crown Heights, True Confections, Gross Misconduct, Mr. Rock 'n' Roll: The Alan Freed Story, The Path to 9/11, Solo, The Last Days of Patton, Mama and Easy Land.

He has appeared in the TV series Nikita, The Event, The Line, A Taste of Shakespeare, Relic Hunter, Goosebumps, Due South, Law & Order, RoboCop: The Series, Street Legal, The Hitchhiker, Forever Knight, Lifetime's MISSING, Angela's Eyes, Hannibal and Orphan Black. He also had recurring roles on the FX TV series The Strain (as Everett Barnes), on the Syfy series The Expanse as the villain Dresden, and Bitten as the Alpha Werewolf for the Russian pack, and a main role in Bad Blood as Enzo Cosoleto.

Kash was also featured in Ubisoft's 2014 video game Watch Dogs as main antagonist Damien Brenks. He also voiced Orion in the 2014 Video game "Thief" as Orion, the main villain.

Personal life
Kash resides in Toronto, Ontario and Los Angeles, California with his wife and their two sons (Kenzie Kash, Tyson Kash)

Filmography

Aliens (1986) .... Private Spunkmeyer
The Last Days of Patton (1986, TV Movie) .... Melvin
Nightbreed (1990) .... Labowitz
True Confections (1991, TV Movie) .... Laurence Albert Simon
Hurt Penguins (1992) .... Nick Piccione
Farther West (1992)
Gross Misconduct (1993, TV Movie) .... Brian 'Spinner' Spencer
The Michelle Apartments (1995) .... Dean
Virus (1996) .... Ripley
Wounded (1997) .... David Boyd
Ernest in the Army (1998) .... Danny - Crew Guy
The Sleep Room (1998) .... Aaron Rothenberg
Goosebumps (1998, TV series) ... Karl Knave
Bone Daddy (1998) .... Rocky
American Whiskey Bar (1998)
Hidden Agenda (1999) .... Volker Flenske
Mr. Rock 'n' Roll: The Alan Freed Story (1999, TV Movie) .... Hooke
External Affairs (1999) .... Sergei Kulekin
Pilgrim (2000) .... Hogan
Life with Judy Garland: Me and My Shadows (2001, TV Mini-Series) .... Arthur Freed 
Exit Wounds (2001) .... Rory
Don't Say a Word (2001) .... Detective Garcia
Going Back (2001) .... Eric
The Shipping News (2001) .... Detective Danzig
Interstate 60 (2002) .... Elmer the Bettor
The Tuxedo (2002) .... Rogers
The Gospel of John (2003) .... Simon Peter
Cold Creek Manor (2003) .... Local
Direct Action (2004) .... LoPresti
The Good Shepherd (2004) .... Jeffrey Altman
Cinderella Man (2005) .... Reporter #3
The Hunt for the BTK Killer (2005, TV Movie) .... Hurst Laviana
Lucky Number Slevin (2006) .... Bodyguard #1
The Path to 9/11 (2006, TV Mini-Series) .... Dave Williams
One Way (2006) .... Bert Zikinsky
Fugitive Pieces (2007) .... Maurice
Diary of the Dead (2007) .... Police Officer
Jack Brooks: Monster Slayer (2007) .... Counselor Silverstein
Magic Flute Diaries (2008) .... Monostatos
Puck Hogs (2009) .... Sergei Ulonov
Repo Men (2010) .... Chipped Tooth
Camp Rock 2: The Final Jam (2010, TV Movie) .... Axel
Casino Jack (2010) .... Gus Boulis
Citizen Gangster (2011) .... Al
On the Road (2012) .... Henry Glass
A Dark Truth (2012) .... Caller
Mama (2013) .... Dr. Dreyfuss
Solo (2013) .... Ray
Breakout (2013) .... Chuck
RoboCop (2014) .... John Lake
Corner Gas: The Movie (2014) .... Jerome's Lawyer
Remember (2015) .... Retirement Home Director
Born to Be Blue (2015) .... Prothodontist (voice)
Manhattan Undying (2016) .... Det. Roberts
Joseph & Mary (2016) .... High Priest
XXX: Return of Xander Cage (2017) .... Russian Spymaster
Ordinary Days (2017) .... Abe Barnard
Crown Heights (2017)
Bad Blood Season 2 (2018) .... Lorenzo "Enzo" Cosoleto
The Kindness of Strangers (2019) .... Jeff's Landlord
Easy Land (2019)
Tiny Pretty Things (2020) .... Sgt. Dan Lavery
The Man from Toronto (2022) .... Detective Elkins

References

External links

 

1959 births
20th-century Canadian male actors
21st-century Canadian male actors
Male actors from Montreal
Male actors from Toronto
Alumni of the Drama Centre London
Anglophone Quebec people
Canadian expatriate male actors in the United States
Canadian male film actors
Canadian people of Jewish descent
Canadian people of Irish descent
Canadian people of Scottish descent
Canadian male television actors
Canadian male voice actors
English-language film directors
Film directors from Montreal
Film directors from Toronto
Jewish Canadian male actors
Living people
Jewish Canadian filmmakers